Belvedere Park is a census-designated place (CDP) in DeKalb County, Georgia, United States. The population was 15,152 at the 2010 census.

Geography
Belvedere Park is located at  (33.748855, -84.259617).
It is bordered by:
 the Atlanta neighborhood of East Lake to the west
 the cities of Avondale Estates and Decatur to the north
 the Candler-McAfee CDP to the south

History
Belvedere Park emerged beginning in 1952 as a planned community with schools, parks, and a shopping center. It continued to grow and expand throughout the decade.

Housing tracts
In 1958, the Atlanta Journal advertised houses in Belvedere Park for between $11,000 and $14,800. One ad proclaimed: “Buy a Home in Belvedere Park with a 100% GI Loan - A Complete Established Community of Distinction and Quality Convenient to Everything.” A majority of homes in Belvedere Park are one-story and while some are traditional red brick ranch homes, contemporary style houses were also built. Adair Realty and Loan, a powerful real estate company in Atlanta during the early to mid 20th century, represented Belvedere Park.

Belvedere Motel
The Belvedere Motel, operated by the renowned Dinkler Hotel Corporation, opened with telephones and large screen televisions in every room. The motel claimed to be “dedicated to your traveling comfort” — additional amenities included a playground and a shuffleboard court.

Opening of Rich's
In 1959, the second branch of Rich's Department Store was opened in the Belvedere Shopping Center (the first branch was opened at Lenox Square Mall). Rich's added an air of metropolitan living to the  suburbs.

In 1963, Towers High School was opened and is still in operation today. Midway Park on Midway Road is a popular recreational center. It has several fields for baseball and football and a public swimming pool.

Demographics

2020 census

As of the 2020 United States census, there were 15,113 people, 6,086 households, and 3,251 families residing in the CDP.

2000 census
As of the census of 2000, there were 18,945 people, 6,524 households, and 4,527 families residing in the CDP. The racial makeup of the CDP was 13.16% White, 82.38% African American, 0.18% Native American, 0.94% Asian, 0.02% Pacific Islander, 1.69% from other races, and 1.62% from two or more races. Hispanic or Latino of any race were 3.48% of the population.

There were 6,524 households, out of which 35.3% had children under the age of 18 living with them, 31.7% were married couples living together, 31.5% had a female householder with no husband present, and 30.6% were non-families. 22.6% of all households were made up of individuals, and 4.5% had someone living alone who was 65 years of age or older.  The average household size was 2.90 and the average family size was 3.43.

In the CDP, the population was spread out, with 30.1% under the age of 18, 10.6% from 18 to 24, 32.6% from 25 to 44, 20.2% from 45 to 64, and 6.4% who were 65 years of age or older.  The median age was 31 years. For every 100 females, there were 86.5 males.  For every 100 females age 18 and over, there were 79.4 males.

The median income for a household in the CDP was $36,144, and the median income for a family was $37,207. Males had a median income of $29,134 versus $26,323 for females. The per capita income for the CDP was $15,524.  About 14.1% of families and 16.7% of the population were below the poverty line, including 23.4% of those under age 18 and 11.3% of those age 65 or over.

2010 Census Information
Belvedere Park, Georgia - Overview 2010 Census 
                                                 Counts      Percentages 
Total Population 
Total Population                                 15,152      100.00% 
  
Population by Race 
American Indian and Alaska native alone              40      0.26% 
Asian alone 122 0.81% 
Black or African American alone                  11,557      76.27% 
Native Hawaiian and Other Pacific native alone        3       0.02% 
Some other race alone                               215       1.42% 
Two or more races                                   303       2.00% 
White alone                                       2,912      19.22%

Education
It is within the DeKalb County School District.
 Elementary schools: Peachcrest (in the CDP) and Snapfinger (outside of the CDP)
 Middle schools: Mary McLeod Bethune and Columbia (both outside of the CDP)
 High schools: Towers High School (in the CDP) and Columbia High School (outside of the CDP).

Economy

The community's economy contains Belvedere Plaza, which had the second suburban Rich's department store (after Lenox Square in Atlanta), currently a market for Afro-centric sales products.

References

Census-designated places in DeKalb County, Georgia
Census-designated places in Georgia (U.S. state)
Unincorporated communities in Georgia (U.S. state)
Unincorporated communities in DeKalb County, Georgia
Census-designated places in the Atlanta metropolitan area